The women's 1500 metres event  at the 1989 IAAF World Indoor Championships was held at the Budapest Sportcsarnok in Budapest on 4 March.

Results

References

1500
1500 metres at the World Athletics Indoor Championships